The 2013–14 season is FK Partizan's 8th season in Serbian SuperLiga. This article shows player statistics and all matches (official and friendly) that the club have and will play during the 2013–14 season.

Players

Squad statistics

Top scorers
Includes all competitive matches. The list is sorted by shirt number when total goals are equal.

Starting 11

Transfers

In

Out

For recent transfers, see List of Serbian football transfers summer 2013 and List of Serbian football transfers winter 2013-14.

Competitions

Overview

Serbian SuperLiga

League table

Results and positions by round

Matches

Serbian Cup

UEFA Champions League

Qualifying phase

UEFA Europa League

Play-off round

Friendlies

Generali Deyna Cup 2013

Sponsors

See also
 List of FK Partizan seasons

References

External links
 Official website 
 Partizanopedia 2013-14  (in Serbian)

FK Partizan seasons
Partizan
Partizan
Partizan